Mulford Creek is a  long 1st order tributary to the Cape Fear River in Bladen County, North Carolina.

Course
Mulford Creek rises on the Mulford Bay divide about 3 miles south-southwest of White Lake, North Carolina.  Mulford Creek then flows southwest to join the Cape Fear River about 3 miles south of White Lake.

Watershed
Mulford Creek drains  of area, receives about 49.5 in/year of precipitation, has a wetness index of 603.54 and is about 20% forested.

See also
List of rivers of North Carolina

References

Rivers of North Carolina
Rivers of Bladen County, North Carolina
Tributaries of the Cape Fear River